Campus Honeymoon is a 1948 American comedy film directed by Richard Sale, written by Jerome Gruskin and Richard Sale, and starring Lyn Wilde, Lee Wilde, Adele Mara, Richard Crane, Hal Hackett and Wilson Wood. It was released on February 1, 1948 by Republic Pictures.

Plot

Twin sisters Skipper and Patricia Hughes are new students at a college where homecoming soldiers Bob Watson and Rick Adams intend to enroll. Unable to find lodging required for enrollment, the foursome is invited by Bessie Ormsbee, a WAC, to take up residence in a veterans' housing facility, mistakenly believing them to be two married couples.

Bessie and husband Busby are in charge of the housing facility, which is opposed by Senator Hughes, uncle of the twins, who is trying to curb government funding. Trouble also ensues when their nephew Junior begins to suspect the four aren't married, and the sweethearts of Skipper and Bob show up on campus.

Bob proposes a marriage of convenience to Skipper, who declines, even though she's fallen in love with him. Senator Hughes, discovering the arrangement, points out that due to common-law marriages, the girls and guys are already legally husbands and wives. All four happily decide to keep it that way.

Cast   
Lyn Wilde as Skipper Hughes
Lee Wilde as Patricia Hughes
Adele Mara as Bessie Ormsbee
Richard Crane as Robert Watson
Hal Hackett as Richard Adams
Wilson Wood as Busby Ormsbee
Stephanie Bachelor as Dean Carson
Teddy Infuhr as Junior Ormsbee
Edwin Maxwell as Sen. Hughes
Boyd Irwin as Dr. Shumway
Kay Morley as Polly Walker
Charles Smith as Benjie Briggs
Edward Gargan as Motorcycle Cop
Maxine Semon as Waitress
William Simon as Messenger

References

External links 
 

1948 films
American comedy films
1948 comedy films
Republic Pictures films
Films directed by Richard Sale
American black-and-white films
1940s English-language films
1940s American films